RU-24,969 is a drug and research chemical widely used in scientific studies. It is a selective agonist at the 5-HT1A and 5-HT1B receptors, with preference for the latter. As with other 5-HT1B agonists such as CP-94,253, RU-24,969 has been found to increase the reinforcing properties of cocaine, suggesting a role for 5-HT1B receptors in cocaine addiction.

See also
 RU-28306
 SN-22

References 

5-HT1A agonists
5-HT1B agonists
5-HT7 agonists
Phenol ethers
Tetrahydropyridines